The Wales Masters was an annual Welsh darts tournament that inaugurated in 2007 until 2019.

List of tournaments

Men's

See also
 List of BDO ranked tournaments
 List of WDF tournaments

References

External links

Darts tournaments
Recurring sporting events established in 2007
Recurring sporting events disestablished in 2019
2007 establishments in Wales
2019 disestablishments in Wales